Sir Thomas Overbury is a 1723 tragedy by the British writer Richard Savage. It is based on the life of Thomas Overbury an associate of the Jacobean royal favourite Robert Carr whose apparent murder while incarcerated in the Tower of London provoked a trial and major scandal.

Savage played the title role himself when it was staged at the Drury Lane Theatre. Other cast members included Roger Bridgewater as the Earl of Northumberland, Theophilus Cibber as the Earl of Somerset and Anne Brett as Isabella. Aaron Hill produced and revised the text of the play. It was published in October 1723. Historian Richard Holmes has dismissed the work as "clumsy, sub-Shakespearean, historical melodrama".

References

Bibliography
 Bellany, Alastair. The Politics of Court Scandal in Early Modern England: News Culture and the Overbury Affair, 1603-1660. Cambridge University Press, 2007.
 Burling, William J. A Checklist of New Plays and Entertainments on the London Stage, 1700-1737. Fairleigh Dickinson Univ Press, 1992.
 Gerrard, Christine. Aaron Hill: The Muses' Projector, 1685-1750. Oxford University Press, 2003.

1723 plays
British plays
West End plays
Tragedy plays
Plays set in London
Plays set in the 17th century
Plays based on real people
Cultural depictions of British men